Sacred Heart College may refer to:

Australia
Sacred Heart College, Ballarat, a former Catholic all girls secondary school in Ballarat
Sacred Heart College, Geelong, a Catholic school for girls in Victoria
Sacred Heart College, Kyneton, a Catholic co-ed Secondary School run by the Sisters of Mercy
Sacred Heart College Middle School, a Marist all-boys middle school in South Australia
Sacred Heart College, New Town, a co-educational school in Hobart, Tasmania
Sacred Heart College (Adelaide), a Marist co-educational senior school in South Australia
Sacred Heart College, Sorrento, a Catholic co-educational secondary school in Western Australia
Sacred Heart Girls' College, Oakleigh, Melbourne, a Catholic school for girls in Victoria
Sacred Heart Primary School, Kew, Victoria, a Catholic co-educational school

Belize
Sacred Heart College, Cayo, a High School and Junior College in San Ignacio, Cayo District

Hong Kong
Sacred Heart Canossian College

India
Sacred Heart College, Thevara, Kerala
Sacred Heart College, Thirupattur

New Zealand
Sacred Heart College, Auckland, a Catholic Marist boys' school in Glendowie, Auckland
Sacred Heart College, Christchurch, a Catholic secondary school for girls
Sacred Heart College, Lower Hutt, a Catholic secondary school for girls
Sacred Heart College, Napier, a Catholic secondary school for girls
Sacred Heart Girls' College, Hamilton, a Catholic secondary school for girls
Sacred Heart Girls' College, New Plymouth, a Catholic secondary school for girls

Philippines
Sacred Heart College, Lucena City, Quezon Province

South Africa
Sacred Heart College, Johannesburg

United Kingdom

England
Sacred Heart Catholic College, in Crosby, Merseyside, England

Northern Ireland
Sacred Heart College, Omagh

United States
 Sacred Heart College, now called Jesuit High School (Tampa), Florida
 Sacred Heart College, now called Newman University, Wichita, Kansas
 Sacred Heart College, now part of Belmont Abbey College, North Carolina
 Sacred Heart College (Wisconsin), a Jesuit-run college in Prairie du Chien

See also
College of the Sacred Heart (disambiguation)
Sacred Heart (disambiguation)
Sacred Heart High School (disambiguation)